The National Company for Subsidies for the Population (Spanish: Compañía Nacional de Subsistencias Populares, CONASUPO) was a Mexican parastatal in charge of developing actions related with the system of supply and Mexican alimentary security. It was created in 1962 with the intention of guaranteeing the purchase and regulation of prices in products of the basic diet, particularly corn. 

In 1965, beside the CONASUPO, the Milk Hydration Company was created, that in 1972 would transform itself into Liconsa, with the purpose of helping the most needy people in the urban and rural sectors. It was during this period, that the government established  big warehouses of supply and community shops of CONASUPO.

The programs of the Conasupo increased the consumption of food in the poorest sectors of the country through general subsidies. 

It was shut down in 1999. After this, Liconsa operated under the same precepts as CONASUPO.

References

Food and drink companies of Mexico
Government of Mexico